Shane Knox (born 8 September 1965) is an Australian boxer. He competed in the men's featherweight event at the 1984 Summer Olympics. At the 1984 Summer Olympics, he lost to Charles Lubulwa of Uganda.

References

1965 births
Living people
Australian male boxers
Olympic boxers of Australia
Boxers at the 1984 Summer Olympics
Place of birth missing (living people)
Featherweight boxers